Arthur William Green (27 July 1904 – 19 August 1981) was a British sprinter. He competed in the men's 400 metres at the 1928 Summer Olympics.

References

1904 births
1981 deaths
Athletes (track and field) at the 1928 Summer Olympics
English male sprinters
Olympic athletes of Great Britain
Sportspeople from Birmingham, West Midlands